This is a list of episodes from the children's animated television series, Curious George. Most episodes are set either in the city or in the country. In the city, George lives in an apartment building with The Man in the Yellow Hat and in the country they share a small house near Lake Wanasinklake. This allows George to mirror the experiences of kids who live in an urban environment and those who live in a rural environment. There are exceptions to this; some episodes take place in alternative settings such as an airport or a train station.

Series overview

Episodes

Season 1 (2006–07)

Season 2 (2007–08)

Season 3 (2008–09)

Season 4 (2009–10)

Season 5 (2010–11)
This is the first season to use 16:9 aspect ratio.

Season 6 (2011–12)

Season 7 (2012–13)

Season 8 (2014)

Season 9 (2014–15)

Season 10 (2018)

Season 11 (2019)

This is the final traditionally animated season of Curious George made with Toon Boom Harmony.

Season 12 (2020)

This is the first flash-animated season of Curious George made with Adobe Animate instead of Toon Boom Harmony.

Season 13 (2020)

Season 14 (2021)

Season 15 (2022)

Specials

References

Curious George
Lists of American children's animated television series episodes